Arsénio Sebastião Cabungula or Love (born March 14, 1979) is an Angolan retired footballer. He has been Angolan top scorer twice in 2004 and 2005. He played as a forward in his home country. He has won 3 Girabola titles with ASA.

He is a member of the Angola national team and played regularly, though usually as a substitute. He was in his country's squad for the 2006 FIFA World Cup in Germany.

1º de Agosto striker Arsénio Sebastião Cabungula "Love" was a new addition for Petro de Luanda football team, for the second half of national first division soccer league, also dubbed Girabola 2010. The athlete was loaned from 1º de Agosto to Petro de Luanda for a six-month period, with the contract ending in December 2010.

In 2017, he was appointed as the Angolan U17 national team head coach and concurrently, he is serving as an assistant manager with the Angola national football team.

National team statistics

International goals
Scores and results list Angola's goal tally first.

References

External links

1979 births
2006 Africa Cup of Nations players
2006 FIFA World Cup players
2008 Africa Cup of Nations players
2010 Africa Cup of Nations players
2011 African Nations Championship players
2012 Africa Cup of Nations players
Angola international footballers
Angolan footballers
Atlético Petróleos de Luanda players
Atlético Sport Aviação players
C.D. Primeiro de Agosto players
C.R. Caála players
G.D. Sagrada Esperança players
Kabuscorp S.C.P. players
Girabola players
Living people
Footballers from Luanda
Association football forwards
Angola A' international footballers